Hart Island may refer to:

Islands
Hart Island (Maryland), Chesapeake Bay, USA; an island now part of Hart-Miller Island
Hart Island (Bronx), New York City, New York State, USA; an island in Long Island Sound formerly part of Westchester County
Hart Island (Washington), in Skagit County, state of Washington, USA; an island on the Skagit River

Other uses
 Hart Island (book) a 1998 book about the Bronx island by Melinda Hunt and Joel Sternfeld

See also

Heart Island,  an island in the Saint Lawrence River in New York